Joseph William Beacham (April 8, 1874 – July 28, 1958) was an American football player, coach and retired United States Army brigadier general.  He served as the head football coach at Cornell University in 1896 and at the United States Military Academy in 1911, compiling a career college football record of 11–4–2.

Biography

Beacham was born on April 8, 1874. He graduated from Cornell University in 1897.  A brigadier general in the United States Army, Beacham was Professor of Military Science and Tactics at Cornell University from 1927 to 1932.

Beacham died at Walter Reed General Hospital in Washington, D.C. on July 28, 1958.  He was buried at Arlington National Cemetery.

Head coaching record

References

1874 births
1958 deaths
19th-century players of American football
Army Black Knights football coaches
Cornell Big Red baseball players
Cornell Big Red football coaches
Cornell Big Red football players
Cornell University faculty
American military personnel of the Spanish–American War
United States Army personnel of World War I
United States Army generals
Sportspeople from Brooklyn
Players of American football from New York City
Burials at Arlington National Cemetery